Sampson Agyapong (born 1 September 2002) is a Ghanaian footballer who currently plays as a forward for Ghana Premier League side WAFA.

He made his professional debut in a Normalisation Committee Special Competition fixture against Elmina Sharks on 15 May 2019.

Career statistics

Club

Notes

References

2002 births
Living people
Ghanaian footballers
Ghana youth international footballers
Association football forwards
Ghana Premier League players
West African Football Academy players